The Last Minister (Russian: Последний Министр, translit. Posledniy Ministr) is a Russian dark comedy television series made by Sreda for KinoPoisk streaming service. As of now two seasons have been produced, plus a 40-minute Christmas special.  Season 2 premiere episode was screened at the Kinotavr Film Festival on September 25, 2021 with the rest of the season starting to air on December 2 same year.  In February 2022 the show permanently went off the air at the request of its show-runner Roman Volobuev in protest against Russian invasion of Ukraine.

Premise 
Tikhomirov, a well-meaning but hapless apparatchik in grips of mid-life crisis is appointed to run Russia's Ministry of Long-term planning - a small, underfunded, understaffed and generally ignored state agency. With a team consisting of sycophants and corrupt cynics he embarks on an idiotic quest to make Russia great again.

Cast and characters

Main 
Yan Tsapnik as Tikhomirov, Minister of Long-term planning
Olga Sutulova as Nechaeva, a corrupt 1st Deputy Minister
Sergey Epishev as Vikentyev, an insane 2nd Deputy Minister
Sofia Lebedeva as Sonya, a naive intern who's rapidly rising through the Ministry's ranks
Anna Shepeleva as Ingeborge, a permanently pregnant Minister's personal assistant
Darya and Ekaterina Nosik as Lutch and Skotch, diabolical twins who run Ministry's Analytical Department
Alexandra Drozdova as Lera, Sonya's assistant (Season 2)

Recurring 
Nelli Uvarova as Raisa, Minister's ex-wife and concrete tycoon
Olga Dibtseva as Larisa, a biathlete and Minister's mistress
Polina Fedina as Kira, Minister's teenage daughter
Fyodor Lavrov as Plotnikov, a functionary from the Prime Minister's Office
Alisa Khazanova as Antonova, a detective with the Investigative Committee of Russia (season 2; guest season 1)
Grigoriy Kaninin as Smirnov, a federal investigator and Antonova's partner (season 2; guest season 1)
Alexander Iliyn as X, prime minister's chief of staff
Roman Volobuev as Y, head of the Department of External Policy
Ekaterina Vilkova as Z, head of the Department of Internal Policy (season 2)
Konstantin Murzenko as Father Vitaliy, a liaison with the Russian Orthodox Church
Ekaterina Gorina as Gerasimenko, an investigative reporter for Telegraph, Russia's only surviving newspaper (season 1)
Ekaterina Steblina as Nemirovskaya, a Moscow correspondent for The Guardian (season 2; guest season 1),

Guests 
Konstantin Bogomolov as Fyodor, a Russia's only Oscar-winning filmmaker
Anna Chipovskaya as Redkina, a vice president of Pornhub
Andrey Merzlikin as Vasya, Minister's childhood friend and a former gangster
Yuri Tsurilo as Ranevskiy, the Governor of Saratov Oblast
Odin Biron as Edward Snowden (season 2)
Alexander Gorchilin as Andrey Zvyaginsev (season 2)
Sergey Gilev as Igor F. Baranoff, Alaskan separatist (season 2)
Timofey Tribuntsev as the voice of Prime Minister (seаson 1)
Aleksandr Bashirov as Prime Minister (seаson 2)

Episodes

Season 1 (2020)

Season 2 (2021)

Production

Background 
Producer Aleksandr Tsekalo started developing a comedy about corrupt bureaucrats originally known as The Ministry in 2015. The pilot was written by Pavel Bardin with Maksim Pezhemsky slated to direct. Due to high level of political censorship on Russian broadcast TV Tsekalo was unable to find a network willing to commission the show, but  the emergence of streaming services eventually allowed him to sidestep the obstacle. In 2018 Roman Volobuev and Lena Vaninа were signed to write a 15-episode first season with Volobuev directing.

Writing 
Volobuev described The Last Minister as "an Aaron Sorkin show were everyone has irrevocably lost their conscience". Some of the show's characters and ideas were borrowed from Volobuev and Vanina's aborted series Zavtra about Russia’s liberal opposition unexpectedly winning presidential elections in 2018.

Filming 
The show's first season was filmed in 2019 over period of 3 months mostly on soundstage in Moscow. Principal photography on the second season started in October 2020.

Reception

Critical response 
The show's first season won acclaim from Russian critics for its absurdist setting, writing and visual stile. Mikhail Trofimenkov of Kommersant called it “the one comedy to capture and preserve the spirit of ‘era of stability’ (an ironic Russian moniker for Putin's years in power)”. It was also praised for breaking an unofficial ban on LGBTQ characters on Russian TV by making one of its main protagonists — Nechaeva — a closeted lesbian.  Some outlets criticised the series for relying too heavily on inside jokes and playing safe with its political subject matter. Ogoniok’s Andrey Archangelsky called out show’s writing team for “falling too much in love with their own characters, effectively becoming their hostages” and eventually “drifting away from the subjects of big politics, greed and power-lust towards much safer and well-trodden melodramatic story”.

Awards 
For its first season The Last Minister was nominated for APKiT Awards in a Best Comedy Series category.

Second season was nominated for National Web Industry Awards in three categories: best series, best director and best actor.

Censorship controversy 
After Season 2 was completed in early 2021 its release was delayed, pre-production on the planned Season 3 was also halted. According to the BBC investigation  the show was deemed ‘politically problematic’  because of episodes depicting a fictional secession of Saratov Oblast from the Russian Federation and satirising a real-life criminal case against the former Khabarovsk Krai Governor Sergei Furgal. A week after BBC Russian Service broke the story Season 2 air date was announced. KinoPoisk CEO and show’s executive producer Olga Filipuk later denied censorship claims citing “boring aspects of repertoire planning, nothing as dramatic as being banned or unbanned” as a sole reason for Season 2 being delayed.

Going off the air in protest against Russian invasion of Ukraine 
Season 2 finale slated to air on February 23, 2022 was shelved indefinitely in protest against Russian invasion of Ukraine.  In a statement posted on Twitter Roman Volobuev wrote that this was done at his request since he no longer saw it possible to make light-hearted jokes about Russian politics. He also called out show’s supposed fans among Russian government officials: ‘Horror films should be made about you, not comedies. Go take a look in a mirror, check if your reflection still looks human’.

References

External links 
 
 The Last Minister on kinopoisk.ru
 The Last Minister on Mubi

2020s Russian television series
Russian political television series